La stazione, internationally released as The Station, is a 1990  Italian comedy-drama film directed by Sergio Rubini.

For this film Rubini won a David di Donatello for Best New Director and Margherita Buy was awarded with a David di Donatello for Best Actress.

Cast 
 Sergio Rubini as Domenico
 Margherita Buy as Flavia
 Ennio Fantastichini as  Danilo 
 Emilio Solfrizzi

See also 
List of Italian films of 1990

References

External links

1990 films
Films directed by Sergio Rubini
Italian comedy-drama films
1990 comedy-drama films
1990 directorial debut films
1990s Italian-language films
1990s Italian films